The Japan Federation of National Public Service Employees' Unions (Kokko Roren) is a trade union representing public sector workers in Japan.

The union was established on 1 October 1975, to bring together the various public sector unions affiliated with the General Council of Trade Unions of Japan (Sohyo).  On formation, it had 87,112 members:

Membership grew to 138,503 by 1989.  That year, Sohyo merged into the Japanese Trade Union Confederation (RENGO).  Kokko Roren decided instead to become a founding affiliate of the National Confederation of Trade Unions, although a section which wished to join RENGO split away and formed the Japan Central Federation of National Public Service Employees' Unions.  By 2019, the union's membership had fallen to 60,454.

The union's largest affiliates include:

All Economy, Trade and Industry Labor Union
All Health and Welfare Ministry Workers' Union
 All Japan National Hospital Workers' Union
 All Judiciary Administration Employees' Union
 Labour Ministry Workers' Union
 Labour Union of MLIT, JMA and Affiliates
 Justice Ministry Employees' Union
 National Tax Collectors' Union

References

External links

Public sector trade unions
Trade unions established in 1975
Trade unions in Japan